Be Somebody... or Be Somebody's Fool! is a 1984 motivational video hosted by American actor Mr. T and distributed by MCA Home Video.

Synopsis
The video proceeds strongly from new wave and R&B culture of the mid-1980s to appeal to children to respect adults, avoid peer pressure, and build self-confidence. It features a showcase of emerging talent, including Ice-T, New Edition, Fergie (credited as "Stacy Ferguson"), Kelly Jo Minter, Martika, Janice Kawaye, Tammy Townsend, Bumper Robinson, Shanice and Valerie Landsburg. Several years later, the video has led to a proliferation of video clips that are posted on the Internet.

Production
The project was produced by Topper Carew, a sitcom writer who has recently worked with Mr. T, who also served as a producer and writer on the feature film D.C. Cab. Mr. T returned to motivational roles for the 2006 television series I Pity the Fool.

Music
A soundtrack album by MCA Records were also released in the coincidence of the video.

Book
A companion book by St. Martin's Press, but published in the same year as the video.

Segments
Be Somebody consists of many segments, with each delineated by a title caption at the bottom of the screen. These include:

 Shyness - A young girl (Janice Kawaye) asserts herself by using her temper.
 Roots - Mr. T says, "Ya can't know where you're going if ya don't know where you're from" and explains the symbolism of his gold chains.
 Anger - Mr. T tells children to use their anger, not to lose it, but fails to fully employ this when a fly continues to bother him.
 Frustration - Throughout the video, Mr. T tries to play the cello and finally succeeding.
 Styling - Mr. T encourages children to dress up and express themselves.
 Peer Pressure - A group of children on a dock take beer and cigarettes from the garbage, while nearby, Mr. T shakes his head and boy band New Edition sing a song disdaining peer pressure.
 Recouping - When a child trips on the sidewalk, "Dr. T" shows how one can preserve their dignity after an "absoludicrous" mistake by playing it off as a breakdancing move.
 Creating - A group of children breakdancing and encourage Mr. T to try some moves.
 Treat Your Mother Right - Mr. T raps "Treat Your Mother Right", a segment that was widely posted on the Internet between 2005 and 2006.
 Workout - Mr. T encourages lazy children at a bus stop to use a boombox as a free weight and balance a bag of popcorn on their heads.
 I Am Somebody - Mr. T raps "I Am Somebody", as well as offering a few guidelines of rap.
 Friendship - Mr. T gives his definition of "friendship", while a girl sings a song about it.
 Mr. T's Tale - Mr. T tells his version of Shakespeare's Romeo and Juliet and gives a pro-reading message.
 Daydreaming - Mr. T explains how having dreams and goals contributes to success.

References

External links
 
 
 Be Somebody... or Be Somebody's Fool! detailed recap at Agony Booth
 DVD-R Hell: Be Somebody or Be Somebody's Fool episode at thecinemasnob.com

Personal development television series
Mr. T